Patience (2016) is a graphic novel by Daniel Clowes, published by Fantagraphics. A science-fiction love story about time travel, it describes the misadventures of a man, Jack, after he finds his pregnant wife, Patience, murdered in their apartment. Many years later, when grief has destroyed his life, chance leads him to discover a time machine, which he plans to use to save Patience. 

The book's tagline, in a surreal and tongue-in-cheek style typical of Clowes, is, "a cosmic timewarp deathtrip to the primordial infinite of everlasting love". The book uses bright, contrasting colours to evoke atmosphere, as well as surrealistic sci-fi imagery, when Jack free-falls between dimensions and has nightmarish visions of himself outside time and space. (Clowes' visual approach in his graphic novels tends to vary between full, even gaudy colour, and muted blues and greens that create a black-and-white effect, as in Ghost World and David Boring.)

Background and creation
Patience is Clowes' longest book, at around 180 pages, and is the second by him, after Wilson, to not have been serialized first, either in Eightball — his own comic book series — or elsewhere. Clowes credits in the book Alvin Buenaventura with technical and production assistance. Buenaventura committed suicide in February 2016, the month before Patience'''s release.

Film adaptation
On December 13, 2016, Clowes announced that he would write the film adaptation for Patience for Focus Features. While promoting Wilson, Clowes spoke about how, unlike his previous adaptations, Patience'' is about the right length to fit in a film screenplay, saying, "It’s interesting – I thought that I was going to have to chop stuff, which would be the first time. Usually I’m having to add material. But it’s actually turning out to be the right length in the way I conceived it, so that’s one of those things you never know when you start. It’s magically working out in that way, so I take that as a good sign."

References

Comics by Daniel Clowes
2016 graphic novels
Comics about time travel
Science fiction comics
Drama comics
2016 comics debuts
2016 comics endings